Elena Carapetis is an Australian actress and writer, best known for her role as Jackie Kassis in Heartbreak High, as well as numerous other television series and theatre roles.

Early life
Elena Carapatis graduated from Australia's National Institute of Dramatic Art (NIDA) with a degree in Performing Arts (Acting) in 1996.

Acting career

Stage
Carapetis has appeared onstage in numerous productions. Her first public performance was in Tonight We Improvise at Adelaide University's Little Theatre on 10 June 1987. This was followed by appearances in Dogg's Hamlet, Cahoot's Macbeth in 1988.

In 1990, she appeared in The Courtyard of Miracles at the Lion Theatre, Adelaide.

In 1993, Carapetis performed in As You Like It at the Little Theatre, Adelaide.

In 1997, she appeared in Features of Blown Youth at the Queens Theatre, Adelaide.

In 2002, she performed in Parthenon Air at the Sidetrack Theatre, Marrickville, Sydney.

In 2004, Carapetis appeared in a production of Translations and Hot Fudge with the State Theatre Company of South Australia.

In March 2005, Carapetis first performed in It's A Mother! at the Sidetrack Theatre, Marrickville, as part of the Greek Festival of Sydney. She would return to this show in 2006 as part of the Melbourne International Comedy Festival and in 2007 as part of Melbourne's Arts House program.

In 2006 Carapetis again performed in Translations, this time at the Malthouse Theatre, Melbourne and the Beckett Theatre, Southbank. In the same year, she appeared in 4:48 Psychosis at The Queens Theatre Stables, Adelaide.

In 2007 Carapetis played in Assassins, Triple Threat, and This Uncharted Hour.

In 2008, she appeared in Helly's Magic Cup at The Space, Adelaide.

In 2009, she appeared in The Things We Do For Love at the Dunstan Playhouse. She had a leading role in the film Offside.

In 2010, Carapetis performed in Ruby Bruise at the Waterside Theatre, Port Adelaide.

In 2011, appeared in transumer: deviate from the norm at the Waterside Hall, Port Adelaide.

In 2012, she played all "the other" roles in the play Truck Stop, including a doctor, counselor, mother and grungy teenage boy.

Films and TV
Carapetis has acted in several feature films, including  Look Both Ways (2005) and Bad Blood (2017), and television series , including Heartbreak High (1998–1999), All Saints (2000–2009), and The Hunting (2019).

Voice
She has also worked extensively as a voice-over artist on advertising campaigns.

Writing

Stage plays
Carapetis wrote the stage play Helen Back in 2011. It has been performed in several places, including Sydney and Adelaide. The play made the shortlist for the drama award at the 2012 Adelaide Festival Awards.

Her play The Good Son had its world premiere at the Bakehouse Theatre in April 2015. Presented by The Other Ones, it was directed by Corey McMahon, and featured Eugenia Fragos, Renato Musolino, Adriana Bonaccurso and Demitrios Sirilas.

Carapetis' rewritten version of Antigone, described as a response to the original written by Sophocles, portrays a feminist theme. The play consists of a series of monologues and vignettes, which together rail against the silencing and devaluing of women in society. The play was produced by the State Theatre Company of South Australia, directed by Anthony Nicola, at the Odeon Theatre in Norwood in June 2022.

Television
In 2007, a script written by Carapetis was selected out of 1,700 submissions as an episode of the 25x5min series Marx and Venus on the SBS.

Filmography

Feature films
 Bad Blood (2017) ... Rose
 Dead Europe (2012) ... Sophie
 Burning Man (2011) ... Jane
 Offside (2009) .... Isabella
 Look Both Ways (2005) .... Maria

Short films
 The Pyjama Monologues (2012) ... Helen
 Dusk (2008), which made the shortlist at the 2008 Tropfest Short Film Festival.
 Frames (2004) .... Eva

TV
 The Hunting (2019) .... Amanda
 Poh's Kitchen
 Wicked Love: The Maria Korp Story (2010)
 All Saints (2000–2009) .... Patrice
 Blue Heelers (2004) .... Cath Matarazzo
 Marking Time (2003) .... Gemma
 Snobs (2003) .... Vet
 Water Rats (2001) .... June Sutcliffe
 Heartbreak High (1998–1999) .... Ms. Jacqueline 'Jackie' Kassis
 Murder Call (1998) .... Despina Stasinopoulos
 Children's Hospital (1998) .... Liz
 Spellbinder: Land of the Dragon Lord (1997) .... Assistant

See also
 Cinema of Australia

References

External links 
 
 

1970 births
Living people
Australian film actresses
Australian television actresses
Australian people of Greek Cypriot descent
Australian people of Greek descent
National Institute of Dramatic Art alumni